Robert Kauffman (born June 6, 1964) is an American businessman, investment banker, racing team owner and racing driver.
Founder of Fortress Investment Group, Kauffman retired from investing in 2012.

Motorsports

In October 2007, Kauffman purchased part ownership of Michael Waltrip Racing, a NASCAR Sprint Cup Series team. Kaufman also owns RK Motors, a car collection in Charlotte, North Carolina, where he resides; he also competes in sports car racing events and has competed in the 2011 and 2012 24 Hours of Le Mans, the 2012 and 2013 24 Hours of Daytona, and in the Rolex Sports Car Series. On July 7, 2014, Kauffman was named the chairman of the Race Team Alliance, a partnership between eighteen Cup teams.

In July 2015, SportsBusiness Daily reported that Kauffman was interested in purchasing a stake in Chip Ganassi Racing. It was verified the next day, when Kauffman confirmed that he was now a part of Ganassi's organization.

Motorsports career results

Sports car racing
(key) (Races in bold indicate pole position, Results are overall/class)

24 Hours of Le Mans results

24 Hours of Daytona

References

External links

Living people
1964 births
Businesspeople from Charlotte, North Carolina

Racing drivers from North Carolina
24 Hours of Le Mans drivers
24 Hours of Daytona drivers
Rolex Sports Car Series drivers
24 Hours of Spa drivers
AF Corse drivers
Michael Waltrip Racing drivers
FIA World Endurance Championship drivers